The Unión Sindical Obrera (USO) is a Spanish trade union. Founded as a clandestine organization in 1961—during the dictatorship of Francisco Franco—the union was an outgrowth of Roman Catholic organizations dedicated to Catholic social teaching, particularly on the dignity of work. Influenced by the French Democratic Confederation of Labour (CFDT), which also had Catholic roots but was by that time drifting away from any formal relation to the church, USO declared itself from the outset to be secular and socialist. Like the CFDT, after 1968 USO advocated autogestion (workers' self-management).

After the Spanish transition to democracy, the group split, with one faction uniting to the Unión General de Trabajadores (historically affiliated with the Spanish Socialist Workers' Party or PSOE), another joining the Workers' Commissions (Comisiones Obreras, affiliated with the Communist Party of Spain), and a third continuing as a small, independent trade union.

References

Trade unions established in 1961
1961 establishments in Spain
Trade unions in Spain